Harry Digweed (1878 – 1965) was an English footballer who played in the Football League for Burton United, and the Southern League for Plymouth Argyle and Portsmouth. He was a half back.

References

1878 births
Footballers from Portsmouth
English footballers
Association football midfielders
Portsmouth F.C. players
Burton United F.C. players
Middlesbrough F.C. players
Plymouth Argyle F.C. players
English Football League players
Southern Football League players
Western Football League players
1965 deaths